Ivan Dolček (born 24 April 2000) is a Croatian professional footballer who plays as a left back or left winger for Šibenik on loan from Hajduk Split in the Croatian First Football League.

Club career 
Dolček started playing football at the local club in Podravske Sesvete, where he comes from. At the age of 9 he moved on to Graničar Đurđevac where he was noticed by GNK Dinamo Zagreb scouts, and he moved to their academy at the age of 11. He went on to stay for four years at the club, spending his last 6 months at the club on loan at HNK Šibenik. At the age of 15, he moved to Slaven Belupo's academy, where he would play for the U-17 and U-19 teams.

On 1 July 2019, Dolček moved from Slaven Belupo to Hajduk Split, signing a four-year contract with the club from Split.

On 9 July 2019, Dolček scored on his debut appearance for Hajduk Split. He came off the bench in a 2–0 win over Gżira United F.C. in the first qualifying round of the 2019–20 UEFA Europa League and scored in the 95th minute. Dolček got his first Prva HNL goal in his second league game for Hajduk, scoring the opener in a 3–0 win over NK Varaždin at Stadion Varteks.

References

2000 births
Living people
Sportspeople from Koprivnica
Association football midfielders
Croatian footballers
NK Slaven Belupo players
HNK Hajduk Split players
HNK Hajduk Split II players
F.C. Famalicão players
HNK Šibenik players
Croatian Football League players
First Football League (Croatia) players
Primeira Liga players
Croatian expatriate footballers
Expatriate footballers in Portugal
Croatian expatriate sportspeople in Portugal